The Tamarac River is an  tributary of the Red River of the North, flowing entirely within Marshall County, Minnesota, in the United States.

Tamarac River was named for the tamarac tree, via the English translation of the native Ojibwe-language name.

See also
List of rivers of Minnesota

References

Minnesota Watersheds
USGS Hydrologic Unit Map - State of Minnesota (1974)

Rivers of Minnesota
Tributaries of Hudson Bay
Rivers of Marshall County, Minnesota